Fiona Stewart (born 1960) is managing director and owner of the Green Man Festival, an annual independent music festival in Wales. She also sits as chair of the Green Man Trust, a charitable organisation. Stewart has worked as a consultant for the British Council and the Foreign Office. She has previously worked at Glastonbury Festival and Big Chill.

Early career 
Living in Camden Town, Stewart started her career in hospitality and events working as dresser for drag artists at The Black Cap and was a punk rocker, attending countercultural festivals of the 1970s and 1980s. She later moved into the business of festival management, working at Glastonbury Festival and the Big Chill. Stewart then pioneered the concept of the boutique festival, which prioritises an intimate experience with good food and family-friendly events, alongside the musical entertainment. Stewart created the festival control system model first used at the Big Chill in 2001, which is now used internationally at large events. She also developed systems to run outdoor events during the foot-and-mouth disease epizootic, working with environmental health and farmer's union to run festivals during the outbreak. The Sunday Times called her the "mother of the boutique festival" in 2010.

Green Man Festival 

Stewart is managing director and owner of the Green Man Festival, a music festival which takes place every year on the Glanusk Park estate near Crickhowell, in the Brecon Beacons National Park in Wales. Alongside Emily Eavis of Glastonbury Festival she is one of the few female festival directors and she is the only female owner of an independent festival. The festival began in 2003 and by 2018 it welcomed 25,000 guests, operating without any commercial sponsorship. Artists playing at the festival have included Bon Iver, Fleet Foxes, Hot Chip, Robert Plant and Super Furry Animals. In 2018, Green Man Festival was found to contribute an annual £10.4 million to the Welsh economy and each year the festival sells out months in advance.

Stewart is also chair of the Green Man Trust, a charitable organisation. In 2020, it launched an emergency campaign to help Welsh people affected by Storm Dennis and raised £20,000. She has worked as a consultant for the British Council and the Foreign Office, advising on the possibilities of organising music festivals in Brazil, China, India and Serbia. She also curated the Welsh musical selection for the 2012 Cultural Olympiad. Stewart is also a board member of the CPA Concert Promoters Association, the Welsh Government Creative Industry Advisory Panel and the Mid-Wales Growth Scheme.

In 2013 Stewart was given an outstanding achievement award at the UK Festival Awards, is listed as number 24 in the BBC Woman's Hour Music Power list and was shortlisted for a St David Culture Award.

References

External links 
 Green Man Festival official website

Festival directors
Living people
1960 births
Women directors